This is a list of schools in the Darling Downs region of Queensland, Australia, and includes schools in South West Queensland. The region is centred on the inland city of Toowoomba and the towns of Dalby, Roma, St George and Charleville. It includes the local government areas of Shire of Balonne, Shire of Bulloo, Goondiwindi Region, Maranoa Region, Shire of Murweh, Shire of Paroo, Shire of Quilpie, Southern Downs Region, Toowoomba Region, and Western Downs Region.

Prior to 2015, the Queensland education system consisted of primary schools, which accommodated students from kindergarten to Year 7 (ages 5–13), and high schools, which accommodate students from Years 8 to 12 (ages 12–18). However, from 2015, Year 7 became the first year of high school.

State schools

State primary schools

State high schools and colleges

Other state schools 

This includes special schools (schools for disabled children) and schools for specific purposes.

Defunct state schools

Private schools

Catholic primary schools
In Queensland, Catholic primary schools are usually (but not always) linked to a parish. Prior to the 1970s, most schools were founded by  religious institutes, but with the decrease in membership of these institutes, together with major reforms inside the church, lay teachers and administrators began to take over the schools, a process which completed by approximately 1990.

Within the region, most schools are administered by the Catholic Education Office, Diocese of Toowoomba. They are supported by the Queensland Catholic Education Commission, which is responsible for coordinating administration, curriculum and policy across the Catholic school system. Preference for enrolment is given to Catholic students from the parish or local area, although non-Catholic students are admitted if room is available.

Catholic high schools

Independent schools

Most independent schools cater for students from preparatory to year 12.

Defunct private schools

See also
List of schools in Queensland

References

External links
, a directory of Government schools in Queensland. (Department of Education and Training – Queensland Government)
CEO Toowoomba
About Independent schools at Independent Schools Queensland.

Darling Downs
List